Neodictyon is a genus of colonial sea squirts, tunicates in the family Polyclinidae.

Species
The World Register of Marine Species lists the following species:
Neodictyon shumshu Sanamyan, 1998

References

Enterogona
Tunicate genera